Berg is a municipality in the district of Starnberg in Bavaria, Germany, on the shore of the Starnberg Lake. It is most famous for the royal Berg Castle.

Notable residents
German baritone Dietrich Fischer-Dieskau had a home in Berg, where he died in his sleep on 18 May 2012, 10 days before his 87th birthday.

References

Starnberg (district)